Sleeping with Strangers is a 1994 romantic comedy directed by William T. Bolson and written by Joan Carr-Wiggin. The film stars Adrienne Shelly, Alastair Duncan (credited as Neil Duncan), Kim Huffman, Shawn Thompson, and Scott McNeil.

Plot
A popular actress (Shelly) and a rock star (McNeil) come to a small Canadian town with two competing hotels next door to each other.  The rock star is escorted into one of the hotels and the actress checks into the other.  Daniel (Duncan), the owner of one of the two hotels, is trying to stay afloat.  The other hotel owner, Mark (Thompson), is trying to steal away Daniel's business and his fiancée (Huffman).  The paparazzi arrives in town and makes everybody wonder, who is sleeping with whom?

Cast
 Adrienne Shelly as Jenny Dole
 Alastair Duncan as Daniel (credited as Neil Duncan)
 Kim Huffman as Teri
 Shawn Thompson as Mark
 Scott McNeil as Todd Warren
 Gary Jones as Loan Officer
 Anthony Ulc as Sam
 Claire Caplan as Elsie
 Betty Linde as Margaret
 Tamsin Jones as Loan Officer's Daughter

Production
Sleeping with Strangers was filmed around Victoria, British Columbia, Canada with a budget of $2.5 million.

References

External links
 
 

1994 films
Canadian independent films
Films shot in British Columbia
1994 romantic comedy films
English-language Canadian films
Canadian romantic comedy films
Canadian sex comedy films
1990s sex comedy films
1990s English-language films
1990s Canadian films